The FN Model 1905 (from its patent date) or FN Model 1906 (in European countries due to its date of manufacture) was a pistol manufactured by Fabrique Nationale de Herstal from 1906 to 1959.

It is virtually identical to the Colt Model 1908 Vest Pocket, which was based on the same John Browning prototype, and was the inspiration for FN's later Baby Browning design. Although Browning's handgun patents were sold to both FN and Colt, this was the only case in which both companies put the same design into production without any significant modification.

The Model 1905 was used by the Belgian Resistance in 1943 in the Attack on the twentieth convoy, in which more than 100 Jews were saved from a Holocaust train transporting them to Auschwitz concentration camp. The gun is now on display in the Kazerne Dossin museum in Mechelen.

References

Semi-automatic pistols of Belgium
Weapons and ammunition introduced in 1906
.25 ACP semi-automatic pistols